The Yamburg gas field is the world's third largest natural gas field located  north of the Arctic Circle in the Tazovsky and Nadymsky districts in Yamalo-Nenets Autonomous Okrug, Tyumen Oblast, Russia.

History
It was discovered in 1969 by Vasiliy Podshibyakin. Development of the field started in 1980, production started in 1986. It is operated by Gazprom Dobycha Yamburg, a subsidiary of Gazprom.

Reserves

Operations
Since starting operations, Yamburg has produced more than 4.5 trillion cubic meters of natural gas as of October 2012.
In later years, production has moved to the peripheral areas of the field, such as the Aneryakhinskaya and Kharvutinskaya areas. The main export pipeline from the Yamburg field is called the Progress pipeline.

References

External links

  Gazprom dobycha Yamburg

Natural gas fields in Russia
Natural gas fields in the Soviet Union
Gazprom oil and gas fields